Charles Challen (born 8 June 1790) was an English first-class cricketer associated with Sussex who was active in the 1810s. He is recorded in one match in 1814, totalling 0 runs with a highest score of 0.

References

English cricketers
English cricketers of 1787 to 1825
George Osbaldeston's XI cricketers
1790 births
Year of death unknown